The 2007 season of the Bhutanese A-Division was the thirteenth recorded season of top-flight football in Bhutan. The league was won by Transport United, their fourth title in a row and only the second time a team had achieved such a feat since Druk Pol won their fourth title in a row in 1999.

League table
Teams played each other on a home and away basis, with the bottom two teams qualifying for a relegation playoff against the top two teams from the B-Division.

Notable results
The league table for the season is incomplete and only a handful of results are known. However, there are a number of results which are notable due to their high scores, both involving very heavy defeats for the Royal Institute of Health and Sciences team:

In the game between Transport United and RIHS FC, Passang Tshering scored seventeen goals. Sources indicate that the most goals scored by a single player in a game is 16, scored by Panagiotis Pontikos of Olympos Xylofagou against SEK Ayios Athanasios in May 2007 and by Stephane Stanis for RC Strasbourg in the 1940s. It would appear therefore, that Pontikos, having equalled a record that had stood for over 60 years, saw it broken only a few days later.

Relegation playoffs
The top two teams from the B-Division and the bottom two from the A-Division competed in a round robin group to determine the remaining two spots for the 2008 A-Division.

Play off matches

Topscorers

References

Bhutan A-Division seasons
Bhutan
Bhutan
1